The 2022 United States House of Representatives elections in Tennessee was held on November 8, 2022, to elect the nine U.S. representatives from the state of Tennessee, one from each of the state's nine congressional districts. The elections coincide with other elections to the House of Representatives, elections to the United States Senate, and various state and local elections.

These elections were the first under Tennessee's new congressional map after redistricting was completed by the state government. During the general elections, Republican Andy Ogles flipped Tennessee's 5th congressional district, that was formally represented by Democrat Jim Cooper.

Redistricting

The Tennessee Legislature drew new maps for Tennessee's congressional districts to account for the new 2020 Census data. The Republican Party had a trifecta in the Tennessee Government at the time, giving them full control of the redistricting process. Legislators drew the maps for the state from late 2021 through early 2022. The maps that were eventually passed were widely criticized as partisan gerrymanders.

Overview

District 1

The 1st district is based in northeast Tennessee, encompassing all of Carter, Cocke, Greene, Hamblen, Hancock, Hawkins, Johnson, Sullivan, Unicoi, and Washington counties and parts of Jefferson and Sevier counties, and includes the Tri-Cities region. The district was barely impacted by the 2020 redistricting cycle. The incumbent is Republican Diana Harshbarger, who was elected with 74.7% of the vote in 2020 and won re-election in 2022.

Republican primary

Candidates

Nominee
Diana Harshbarger, incumbent U.S. Representative (2021-present)

Disqualified
James Andrew Greene
Gary Wyatt
Chuck Miller

Endorsements

Results

Democratic primary

Candidates

Nominee
Cameron Parsons, employee at Eastman Chemical Company

Independents

Candidates

Declared
Richard Baker, Republican candidate for this seat in 2020
Ahmed Makrom, nurse

General election

Predictions

Results

District 2

The 2nd district is located in eastern Tennessee, anchored by Knoxville. The district was barely impacted by the 2020 redistricting cycle. The incumbent is Republican Tim Burchett, who was re-elected with 67.6% of the vote in 2020 and won re-election in 2022.

Republican primary

Candidates

Nominee
 Tim Burchett, incumbent U.S. Representative (2019–present)

Results

Democratic primary

Candidates

Nominee
 Mark Harmon, professor at the University of Tennessee, former Knox County commissioner (2006–2010), and nominee for Texas's 13th congressional district in 1998

Disqualified
Marcus Lowery

Endorsements

Results

Independents

Candidates

Disqualified
Jeffrey Grunau

General election

Predictions

Results

District 3

The 3rd district encompasses most of the Chattanooga metro in eastern Tennessee, along with several suburban and rural areas near Knoxville and the Tri-Cities. The district was barely impacted by the 2020 redistricting cycle. However, under the new lines, the district no longer touches the border of Kentucky. The incumbent is Republican Chuck Fleischmann, who was re-elected with 67.3% of the vote in 2020 and won re-election in 2022.

Republican primary

Candidates

Nominee
Chuck Fleischmann, incumbent U.S. Representative (2011-present)

Eliminated in primary
Sandy Casey, Navy veteran

Disqualified
Bradley Hayes 
Dewitt Ferrell

Withdrew
Kenny Morgan

Endorsements

Results

Democratic primary

Candidates

Nominee
Meg Gorman, nominee for this seat in 2020

Independents

Candidates

Declared
Thomas Rumba 
Rick Tyler, white supremacist and perennial candidate (Later decided to run for governor instead)

Disqualified
Amber Hysell

General election

Predictions

Results

District 4

The 4th district encompasses the southern part of Middle Tennessee, including Murfreesboro and Lynchburg. The district was barely impacted by the 2020 redistricting cycle, though it does take up more of the southern border of the state. The incumbent is Republican Scott DesJarlais, who was re-elected with 66.7% of the vote in 2020 and won re-election in 2022.

Republican primary

Candidates

Nominee 
Scott DesJarlais, incumbent U.S. Representative (2011-present)

Disqualified 
Charles Dean Smith

Results

Democratic primary

Candidates

Nominee
Wayne Steele, write-in candidate for this seat in 2018

Eliminated in primary
Arnold White

Results

Independent

Candidates
Clyde Benson, veteran
Tharon Chandler, journalist and perennial candidate
David Jones, engineer, and Libertarian activist
Joseph Mayger
Mike Winton, perennial candidate

General election

Predictions

Results

District 5

The 5th district was previously centered on Nashville and the immediate surrounding suburbs, and it also used to contain parts of Cheatham and Dickson county. The incumbent was Democrat Jim Cooper, who ran unopposed in 2020.

On January 25, Cooper announced he would withdraw his candidacy for re-election and refund all campaign contributions, citing the state legislature's move to split Davidson County into three congressional districts.

Under the new Republican redistricting map, the new 5th district shifted from D+7 to R+9 and contains only a small southern part of Nashville, as well as some suburban counties, and some rural counties. The 6th and 7th districts absorbed the western and eastern parts of Davidson county, respectively. 

In the general election, Republican Andy Ogles defeated Democratic challenger Heidi Campbell.

Democratic primary

Candidates

Nominee
Heidi Campbell, state senator

Disqualified
Justicia Rizzo

Withdrawn
Jim Cooper, incumbent U.S. Representative (2003–present)
Odessa Kelly, executive director of Stand Up Nashville (running in the 7th district)

Endorsements

Results

Republican primary

Candidates

Nominee
Andy Ogles, mayor of Maury County

Eliminated in primary
Natisha Brooks, homeschool operator and owner
Beth Harwell, former Speaker of the Tennessee House of Representatives (2011–2019), former State Representative (1989–2019), and candidate for Governor of Tennessee in 2018
Robby "Starbuck" Newsom, film director (write-in)
Kurt Winstead, retired national guard brigadier general
Geni Batchelor, realtor
Tres Wittum, policy and research analyst for state senator Bo Watson
Stewart Parks, realtor
Timothy Bruce Lee, Nashville Fire Department Paramedic
Jeff Beierlein, healthcare executive

Disqualified
Morgan Ortagus, former Spokesperson for the United States Department of State (2019-2021)
Baxter Lee, entrepreneur

Withdrew
Quincy McKnight, businessman and Republican Primary candidate for Tennessee State Senate District 21 (running for Nashville mayor)

Declined
Manny Sethi, orthopedic surgeon and candidate for U.S. Senate in 2020

Endorsements

Polling

Results

Independent Candidates

Candidates

Declared
Derrick Brantley, business development consultant
Daniel Cooper, former Maury County Commissioner
 Rick Shannon, veteran, author, father, pastor, and business owner

General election

Predictions

Polling

Results

District 6

The 6th district takes in the eastern suburbs of Nashville and the northern part of Middle Tennessee, including Hendersonville and Lebanon. The incumbent is Republican John Rose, who was re-elected with 73.7% of the vote in 2020 and won re-election in 2022

Republican primary

Candidates

Nominee
 John Rose, incumbent U.S. Representative (2019–present)

Results

Democratic primary

Candidates

Nominee
Randal Cooper

Eliminated in primary
Clay Faircloth, pastor

Results

General election

Predictions

Results

District 7

The 7th district encompasses the southern suburbs of Nashville and western rural areas of Middle Tennessee, including the city of Clarksville. Green's district was significantly impacted by redistricting, as he now represents a more central part of Tennessee. The 8th district absorbed most of Green's constituents in the Western portion of the state. The incumbent is Republican Mark Green, who was re-elected with 69.9% of the vote in 2020 and won re-election in 2022.

Republican primary

Candidates

Nominee
Mark Green, incumbent U.S. Representative (2019-present)

Endorsements

Results

Democratic primary

Candidates

Nominee
Odessa Kelly, executive director of Stand Up Nashville

Endorsements

Results

Independents

Candidates

Declared
Steven Hooper, candidate for U.S. Senate in 2020

General election

Predictions

Results

District 8 

The 8th district encompasses rural West Tennessee as well as taking in the eastern suburbs of Memphis, including Bartlett, Lakeland, Germantown, and Collierville, as well as the cities of Jackson, Paris, and Dyersburg. After redistricting, it absorbed much of the 7th district's Western state territory. The incumbent is Republican David Kustoff, who was re-elected with 68.5% of the vote in 2020 and re-elected in 2022.

Republican primary

Candidates

Nominee
David Kustoff, incumbent U.S. Representative (2017–present)

Eliminated in primary
Danny Ray Bridger Jr.
Gary Clouse, therapist
Bob Hendry, former Marine Corps Infantry Officer

Results

Democratic primary

Candidates

Nominee
Lynnette Williams, perennial candidate

Eliminated in primary
Tim McDonald

Results

Independents

Candidates

Declared
James Hart, perennial candidate
Ronnie Henley, perennial candidate

General election

Predictions

Results

District 9

The 9th district is based in Memphis. Redistricting left the 9th district intact, but it moved from having a 53% Democratic-leaning seat to a 43% Democratic-leaning seat after taking on some Republican-leaning suburbs. The incumbent is Democrat Steve Cohen, who was re-elected with 77.4% of the vote in 2020 and re-elected in 2022

Democratic primary

Candidates

Nominee
Steve Cohen, incumbent U.S. Representative (2007–present)

Eliminated in primary
M. Latroy Alexandria-Williams, perennial candidate

Endorsements

Results

Republican primary

Candidates

Nominee
Charlotte Bergmann, candidate for this seat in 2012, 2014, and 2020

Eliminated in primary
Leo AwGoWhat, perennial candidate
Brown Dudley

Results

Independents

Candidates

Declared
Dennis Clark, candidate for this seat in 2020
Paul Cook, candidate for this seat in 2014 and 2016
George Flinn, former Shelby County Commissioner and perennial candidate

General election

Predictions

Results

See also
 Elections in Tennessee
 Political party strength in Tennessee
 Tennessee Democratic Party
 Tennessee Republican Party
 Government of Tennessee
2022 Tennessee gubernatorial election
2022 Tennessee Senate election
2022 Tennessee House of Representatives election
 2022 Tennessee elections
2022 United States House of Representatives elections
 2022 United States elections

Notes

Partisan clients

References

External links

 (State affiliate of the U.S. League of Women Voters)

Official campaign websites for 1st district candidates 
Diana Harshbarger (R) for Congress
Cameron Parsons (D) for Congress

Official campaign websites for 2nd district candidates
Tim Burchett (R) for Congress
Mark Harmon (D) for Congress

Official campaign websites for 3rd district candidates
Chuck Fleischmann (R) for Congress
Meg Gorman (D) for Congress

Official campaign websites for 4th district candidates
Scott DesJarlais (R) for Congress
Wayne Steele (D) for Congress

Official campaign websites for 5th district candidates
Heidi Campbell (D) for Congress
Andy Ogles (R) for Congress

Official campaign websites for 6th district candidates
John Rose (R) for Congress
Randal Cooper (D) for Congress

Official campaign websites for 7th district candidates
Mark Green (R) for Congress
Odessa Kelly (D) for Congress

Official campaign websites for 9th district candidates
Steve Cohen (D) for Congress
Charlotte Bergmann (R) for Congress

2022
Tennessee
United States House of Representatives